Michael von der Heide (born 16 October 1971 in Amden, Switzerland) is a Swiss musician, singer, and actor.

Early life
Von der Heide was born the son of a German father and a Swiss mother.

Eurovision Song Contest

Eurovision Song Contest 1999
In 1999, Von der Heide participated in the German national final with the song "Bye Bye Bar", eventually finishing fifth, and did not go on to represent Germany in the Eurovision Song Contest 1999.

Eurovision Song Contest 2009
Von der Heide played a small part as one of the Swiss jurors.

Eurovision Song Contest 2010
On 18 December 2009, it was announced that Von der Heide will represent Switzerland in the Eurovision Song Contest 2010 with the song "Il pleut de l'or". He participated in the second semi-final but finished last in a field of 17 with 2 points and did not qualify to the final.

Personal life
Von der Heide was awarded 5,000 francs by the Federal Court in 2010.   The court determined that coverage of his musical career by the Zürich-based tabloid Blick had been homophobic.   He states in interviews, that he doesn't feel the need to discuss his personal life in public.

Discography

Albums

Singles
1996 – "Erfolg"
1996 – "Mit dir leben"
1998 – "Jeudi amour"
1998 – "Bad Hair Days"
1998 – "Bye Bye Bar"
2000 – "Je suis seul"
2000 – "Where the Wild Roses Grow" – Duet with Kuno Lauener
2000 – "Paradies"
2002 – "Kriminaltango" – Duet with Nina Hagen
2003 – "La solitude"
2005 – "Paris c'est toi (toujours)"
2005 – "Ich bi wie du"
2006 – "Ruggewind"
2006 – "Elodie"
2008 – "Immer wenn du denkst" (Online single in Germany)
2009 – "Gib mir was von dir"
2010 – "Il pleut de l'or"

References

External links

 

1971 births
French-language singers of Switzerland
Swiss LGBT singers
Living people
Swiss people of German descent
Eurovision Song Contest entrants for Switzerland
Eurovision Song Contest entrants of 2010
People from the canton of St. Gallen
21st-century Swiss  male singers